USS Fearless may refer to one of many actual or fictional vessels:

In the United States Navy:

 , a tug in commission from 1917 to 1921
 , an Accentor-class coastal minesweeper, later reclassified as a dive tender (YDT-5), commissioned in 1942 and sunk as a target in 1973
 , an Aggressive-class ocean-going minesweeper in commission from 1954 to 1990

In fiction:
 USS Fearless (NCC-14598), an Excelsior-class starship that appears in Star Trek: The Next Generations "Where No One Has Gone Before"

United States Navy ship names